Trần Thị Kim Thanh (born 18 September 1993) is a Vietnamese footballer who plays as a goalkeeper for Women's Championship club Hồ Chí Minh City I and the Vietnam women's national team.

References

1993 births
Living people
Women's association football goalkeepers
Vietnamese women's footballers
Vietnam women's international footballers
Asian Games competitors for Vietnam
Footballers at the 2018 Asian Games
Southeast Asian Games gold medalists for Vietnam
Southeast Asian Games medalists in football
Competitors at the 2017 Southeast Asian Games
Competitors at the 2019 Southeast Asian Games
21st-century Vietnamese women